General elections were held in Fiji on 31 August 1932, although only one of the nine elected seats was contested.

Electoral system
The Legislative Council consisted of thirteen appointed Civil Servants, nine elected members (six Europeans and three Indo-Fijians) and three Fijians appointed from a list of between four and six potential candidates presented to the Governor by the Great Council of Chiefs. The Governor also sat in the Council as its President.

Voting for Europeans was restricted to men aged 21 or over who had been born to European parents (or a European father and was able to read, speak and write English), who were British subjects and had been continuously resident in Fiji for 12 months, and who either owned at least £20 of freehold or leasehold property or had an annual income of at least £120. A total of 1,533 Europeans (127 in Eastern, 259 in Northern, 750 in Suva, 254 in Vanua Levu & Taveuni and 143 in Western) were registered to vote.

For Indo-Fijians, eligibility was also restricted to men aged 21 or over. They had to be a British subject or from British India, have lived continuously in the Fiji for at least two years, be able to read or write in English, Gujarati, Gurmukhi,  Hindi, Tamil, Telugu or Urdu, and for the previous six months, have either owned property with an annual value of five years, had a net annual cash income of at least £75, or held a Government or municipal licence worth at least £5 annually. A total of 1,585 Indo-Fijians (140 in Eastern, 669 in Northern & Western and 776 in Southern) were enrolled.

In both ethnic categories, civil servants were barred from voting.

Campaign
Between the 1929 elections and the 1932 elections, the leader of the Indo-Fijian community Vishnu Deo had been convicted of an offence and was barred from running for election. The community decided to nominate only two candidates for the three seats, with no-one running in the Eastern Division.

In the European seats, the only candidates were the sitting Council members, resulting in all six being returned unopposed.

Results

Nominated members

Aftermath
After the Legislative Council was opened, the Indo-Fijian members put forward another proposal for a common roll. It had been planned that both elected members would resign after the proposal was rejected, but Northern and Western member Muniswamy Mudaliar refused to give up his seat. Southern Division member K. B. Singh did resign and was re-elected in a by-election the following year, winning by a larger margin. The by-election was boycotted by the Muslim community, who were demanding their own reserved seat.

References

Fiji
1932 in Fiji
Elections in Fiji
Fiji
August 1932 events